Stacy Adams is a brand of menswear including suits,  sleepwear, underwear, sportswear, jewelry, and shoes, with an emphasis on  urban fashions, including styles resembling modern zoot suits, as well as more casual hip-hop clothing.

Stacy Adams is currently owned by Glendale, Wisconsin-based Weyco Group.

History
The Stacy Adams Shoe Company was founded in 1875 in Brockton, Massachusetts by William H. Stacy and Henry L. Adams.

In popular culture
Morris Day, front man of the Minneapolis-based funk and soul band The Time, is known for his large collection of Stacy Adams shoes. He mentions the brand by name in The Time's 1982 song "The Walk", from the album What Time Is It?: "I'm about to walk a hole in my Stacy Adams."  Rapper Coolio mentioned the shoe brand in his song "1,2,3,4 (Sumpin' New)" from the 1995 album Gangsta's Paradise: "Comin' at 'em with a pattern and a fresh pair a' Adams."  It was also used as a reference in Snoop Dogg's song "Stacy Adams" featuring Kokane from the albumThe Last Meal in 1999. Tom Waits also references "my Stacy's are soaking wet" in his song "Tom Traubert's Blues/Waltzing Matilda", from the album Small Change, released in 1976 by Asylum Records. Also on the album Nighthawks at the Diner, in the track "Spare Parts", he has the lyrics " I wiped my Stacy Adams, and I jackknifed my legs". Ryan Gosling's character in Drive (2011 film) wore a pair of the Stacy Adams Madison Cap Toe Boot (in taupe).

References

External links
 
Official Stacy Adams Facebook page
Parent company financial history

Hat companies
Companies based in Wisconsin
Shoe companies of the United States
American companies established in 1875
1875 establishments in Wisconsin